Kirkdale is the name of several places in the United Kingdom:
Kirkdale, Liverpool, an area of Liverpool, England
Liverpool Kirkdale (UK Parliament constituency)
Kirkdale railway station
Kirkdale TMD, a traction maintenance depot
Kirkdale (ward)
Kirkdale, North Yorkshire, England
Kirkdale Estate, Galloway, Scotland; featured in the book The Thirty-Nine Steps by John Buchan
Kirkdale School, Sydenham, London, England